The 2009–10 Big 12 Conference men's basketball season marks the 14th season of Big 12 Conference basketball.

Preseason

Big 12 Coaches Poll

All-Big 12 players
Sherron Collins, Kansas
Willie Warren, Oklahoma
Damion James, Texas
Craig Brackins, Iowa State
James Anderson, Oklahoma State
Cole Aldrich, Kansas

Player of the Year 
James Anderson, Oklahoma State

Newcomer of the Year
Marquis Gilstrap, Iowa State

Freshman of the Year
Avery Bradley, Texas

Regular season

Rankings

In-season honors
Players of the week
Throughout the conference regular season, the Big 12 offices name a player of the week each Monday.

Conference honors

National awards & honors

Academic All-American of the Year
Cole Aldrich, Kansas
CoSIDA

Statistical leaders

Post-season

See also
2009–10 NCAA Division I men's basketball season
2010 Big 12 men's basketball tournament

References